The University of Florida College of Education is the teacher's college, or normal school, of the University of Florida. The College of Education is located on the eastern portion of the university's Gainesville, Florida, campus in Norman Hall, and offers specializations in special education, higher education, educational policy, elementary education, counseling, teaching, and other educational programs. It is consistently ranked one of the top schools of education in the nation. The college was officially founded in 1906. In fiscal year 2020, the College of Education generated $102.8 million in research funding.

National rankings: US News & World Report (2023)
College - #1 in Online Graduate Education
College - #14 in the Nation among Public Institutions
College - #23 in Best Education Schools in the Nation (Public and Private)
Special Education - #5 in Specialty Area
Counselor Education - #6 in Specialty Area
Curriculum and Instruction - #16 in Specialty Area
Elementary Teacher Education - #22 in Specialty Area

Schools and program areas
The College of Education is organized into the following three schools and program areas:

School of Human Development and Organizational Studies in Education (HDOSE) 

 Marriage and Family Counseling
 Mental Health Counseling
 Counselor Education
 Educational Leadership
 Higher Education
 Student Personnel in Higher Education
 Research and Evaluation Methodology (REM)

School of Special Education, School Psychology and Early Childhood Studies (SESPECS) 

 Special Education
 School Psychology
 Early Childhood Education

School of Teaching and Learning (STL) 

 Anatomical Science Education Certificate 
 Computer Science Education  
 Education Technology 
 Elementary Education 
 English Education 
 ESOL/Bilingual Education 
 Mathematics Education 
 Reading and Literacy Education 
 Science or Mathematics Teaching Certificate  
 SITE: Alternative Certification ' Social Studies Education 
 Social Studies Education
 Teacher Leadership Certificate 
 Teacher Leadership School Improvement 
 Teachers, Schools and Society
 UFTeach

Deans

Office of Educational Research 
UF's College of Education faculty and graduate students pursue interdisciplinary research that informs teaching and learning, education policy and leadership in all education disciplines. Faculty engage in activities that enhance overall school improvement, human development, student achievement, early-childhood readiness, assessment and program evaluation, teacher preparation and retention, and classroom technology advances.

Centers, institutes, and affiliates 
 Anita Zucker Center for Excellence in Early Childhood Studies
 Collaboration for Effective Educator Development, Accountability and Reform Center
 Education Policy Research Center
 Institute for Advanced Learning Technologies
 Institute of Higher Education
 Lastinger Center for Learning
 P.K. Yonge Developmental Research School
 University of Florida Literacy Institute

See also
P.K. Yonge Developmental Research School (UF's K-12 laboratory school since 1934)

References

External links
 UF College of Education
 The University of Florida
 Online programs for the College of Education
 Boilerplate profile
 
Discovering Gloria

Education
Educational institutions established in 1906
Schools of education in Florida
University subdivisions in Florida
1906 establishments in Florida